Juan de Lanuza y Garabito (died 1498) was a Spanish noble from the 15th century.

He was the youngest of the 3 sons of Ferrer de Lanuza I, 1st Sieur of Azaila, Cosculluela, Escuer, Arguisal and Esun de Basa. 
Juan's mother was Inés de Garabito y Lanuza, his brothers were Martin, Sieur of Plasencia and Bardallur  and Ferrer, Sieur of Azaila and Cosculluela. His sister was Dianira, who married Pedro de Luna, Sieur of Illueca.

Juan was the Sieur of Escuer, Arguisal and Essun de Basa. 
He was also Viceroy of Valencia around 1492, later Viceroy of Catalonia, till around 1497, having been Admiral of Sicily. 

He married Beatriz de Pimentel. 
His eldest son was Juan de Lanuza y Pimentel (died in Naples, Italy, 1507), Viceroy of Sicily.

References
 Libro de Armoria
 Google Books: Juan de Lanuza

1498 deaths
Viceroys of Catalonia
Viceroys of Valencia